Macdonald, MacDonald or McDonald may refer to:

Organisations
 McDonald's, a chain of fast food restaurants
 McDonald & Co., a former investment firm
 MacDonald Motorsports, a NASCAR team
 Macdonald Realty, a Canadian real estate brokerage firm
 McDonald Centre, a research institute in the University of Oxford

Places

Canada
 Macdonald, Manitoba, a rural municipality
 Macdonald (electoral district), a federal electoral district in Manitoba

United States
 McDonald, Kansas
 McDonald, Missouri
 McDonald, New Mexico
 McDonald, North Carolina
 McDonald, Ohio
 McDonald, Pennsylvania, a borough straddling the boundary between Washington and Allegheny counties
 McDonald Observatory, an astronomical observatory in Texas, United States
 MacDonald, West Virginia

Other places
 Heard Island and McDonald Islands, Australian islands in the Southern Ocean
 McDonald Beach, Antarctica
 McDonald (crater), a lunar impact crater in the Mare Imbrium
 Macdonald River (disambiguation)

People
 Macdonald (name), a list of people with surname Macdonald and its variants
 Justice McDonald (disambiguation)
 Baron Macdonald, a title in the Peerage of Ireland
 Macdonald baronets, two British titles

Given name 

 Macdonald Carey (1913–1994), American actor

Other uses
 Angus L. Macdonald Bridge, a suspension bridge in Canada
 Macdonald triad, a set of psychological characteristics associated with sociopathic behavior
 Macdonald polynomials, in mathematics
 Old MacDonald Had a Farm, a nursery rhyme

See also

 
 
 
 
 
 
 
 
 
 
 
 
 
 MCD (disambiguation)
 Donald (disambiguation)
 Clan Donald
 McDonald v. Chicago, a U.S. Supreme Court case that incorporated the U.S. Constitution's second amendment against the U.S. states
 991 McDonalda (1922 NB), a Themis family asteroid